Mohammad Ibrahim Khan may refer to:

 Muhammad Ibrahim Khan (politician) (1915–2003), Pakistani politician
 Mohammad Ibrahim Khan Jhagra, Pakistani politician
 Muhammad Ibrahim Khan (judge), Pakistani judge and governor
 Muhammad Ibrahim Khan (Pakistani judge) (born 1962), Justice of the Peshawar High Court
 Muhammad Ibrahim Khan Khattak, member of the Pakistani parliament